Puthiyandi Manoj, popularly known as P. Manoj is an Indian cricketer, who has played 10 first-class matches between 1997 and 1999 for Kerala. Manoj was considered as a promising fast bowler as he clean bowled Rahul Dravid in a Ranji Trophy league match, but couldn't sustain his initial success and was soon out of reckoning.

References

External links
 

  
1975 births
Living people
Kerala cricketers
Indian cricketers
South Zone cricketers
Nileshwaram area
People from Kasaragod district